Jagdgeschwader were the series of fighter wings of initially, the German Empire's Luftstreitkräfte air arm of the Deutsches Heer, then the successor fighter wings of the Third Reich's original Luftwaffe air arm of its combined Wehrmacht armed forces (1935-45), and after 1949, the fighter wings of the air arm of the current Federal German Republic's Bundeswehr armed forces, the Luftwaffe.

Jagdgeschwader 1
Royal Prussian Jagdgeschwader I (World War I)
Jagdgeschwader 1 Oesau (Luftwaffe)
Jagdgeschwader 2 Richtofen
Royal Prussian Jagdgeschwader II (World War I)
Jagdgeschwader 3 Udet
Jagdgeschwader III (World War I)
Royal Bavarian Jagdgeschwader IV (World War I)
Jagdgeschwader 5 Eismeer
Jagdgeschwader 26 Schlageter
Jagdgeschwader 27 Afrika
Jagdgeschwader 50
Jagdgeschwader 51 Mölders
Jagdgeschwader 52
Jagdgeschwader 53 Pik As
Jagdgeschwader 54 Grünherz
 Jagdgeschwader 71 
Taktisches Luftwaffengeschwader 71 "Richthofen" (Bundeswehr) 
Jagdgeschwader 71 (World War II)
Jagdgeschwader 73 or Taktisches Luftwaffengeschwader 73 "Steinhoff" (Bundeswehr)
Jagdgeschwader 77 Herz As
Jagdgeschwader 104
Jagdgeschwader 130
Jagdgeschwader 132
Jagdgeschwader 133
Jagdgeschwader 135
Jagdgeschwader 138
Jagdgeschwader 141
Jagdgeschwader 144
Jagdgeschwader 231
Jagdgeschwader 232
Jagdgeschwader 234
Jagdgeschwader 300
Jagdgeschwader 301

See also
Wing (military aviation unit)
Ergänzungs-Jagdgeschwader